Wilfred James (born 19 February 1907) was a Welsh professional footballer who played for Notts County, West Ham United and Charlton Athletic, and internationally for Wales.

Born in Crosskeys, Monmouthshire, James began his football career at Cross Keys School just after the First World War. He played for local sides before joining Newport County. He joined Notts County in October 1928 and scored 6 goals in 16 appearances, before moving to London club West Ham United in May 1930. He made 40 league appearances for West Ham over two seasons, scoring seven goals. He also played in one FA Cup game for the Irons, against Chelsea on 10 January 1931. He was transferred to Charlton Athletic on 26 February 1932 for £600. He later played for Workington and Carlisle United, where he played mostly for the reserves in the North Eastern League.

James played two matches for the Wales national football team. He played his first match on 22 April 1931 against Ireland and his last match on 5 December 1931 against Ireland.

See also
 List of Wales international footballers (alphabetical)

References

1907 births
Date of death missing
People from Crosskeys
Sportspeople from Caerphilly County Borough
Welsh footballers
Wales international footballers
Newport County A.F.C. players
Notts County F.C. players
West Ham United F.C. players
Charlton Athletic F.C. players
Workington A.F.C. players
Carlisle United F.C. players
Association football inside forwards
English Football League players